Sarah Trösch (born 28 September 1994) is a Swiss volleyball player. She is a member of the Women's National Team.
She participated at the 2017 Montreux Volley Masters. 
She plays for NUC VOLLEYBALL.

Clubs 
  Viteos Neuchatel Université (2017)
  Volley Lugano (2018–)

References

External links 
 CEV profile
 SARAH TRÖSCH NUOVO PALLEGGIO LNA

1994 births
Living people
Swiss women's volleyball players
Place of birth missing (living people)